Joseph Mary Marling, C.PP.S. (August 31, 1904 – October 2, 1979) was an American prelate of the Roman Catholic Church. He served as the first bishop of the Diocese of Jefferson City in Missouri from 1956 to 1969.  He previously served as an auxiliary bishop of the Diocese of Kansas City in Missouri.

Biography
Joseph Marling was born on August 31, 1904, in Centralia, West Virginia.  He was ordained as a priest of the Society of Precious Blood by Archbishop John McNicholas on February 21, 1929. 

After a period of academic and pastoral work, he was elected provincial director of the Society's American province in 1938.  During his tenure, Marling expanded St. Joseph's College and built a minor seminary in Canton, Ohio.

Auxiliary Bishop of Kansas City 

On June 7, 1947, Marling was appointed auxiliary bishop of the Diocese of Kansas City, Missouri and titular bishop of Thasus by Pope Pius XII. He received his episcopal consecration on August 6, 1947, from Archbishop Edwin O'Hara, with Bishops Joseph Albers and John Bennett serving as co-consecrators, at St. Peter in Chains Cathedral. Marling chose as his episcopal motto, Per Sanguinem Crucis, meaning “Through the Blood of the Cross." In an address to the Guild of Catholic Psychiatrists, he suggested that the clergy should receive psychiatric treatment.

Bishop of Jefferson City 

Marling was later named the first bishop of the Diocese of Jefferson City on August 24, 1956. During his tenure, he oversaw the construction of a new cathedral, twenty-five churches, twenty-nine schools, thirty rectories, sixteen convents, and a Carmelite monastery. The Bishop also established the diocesan newspaper and missions in Peru.  He attended the Second Vatican Council from 1962 to 1965.

Retirement and legacy 
On July 2, 1969, Pope Paul VI accepted Marling's resignation as bishop of Jefferson City and appointed him as titular bishop of Lesina, a post which he gave up on January 16, 1976.

Joseph Marling died in Kansas City, at age 75. His remains were interred in the Precious Blood Community Cemetery on the seminary grounds in Carthagena, Ohio.

References

External links
Diocese of Jefferson City

1904 births
1979 deaths
Participants in the Second Vatican Council
People from Braxton County, West Virginia
Roman Catholic Diocese of Kansas City–Saint Joseph
Roman Catholic bishops of Jefferson City
20th-century Roman Catholic bishops in the United States
Catholics from West Virginia